London Athletic Club (LAC) is a track and field club based in London, England. It is the oldest independent track and field club in the world and celebrated its first 150 years in 2013. More than sixty athletes connected with the club have since become Olympians and top athletics administrators in Britain. The club is currently based at Barn Elms, in West London.

Club colours 
London Athletic Club’s colours are Classic Green and Old Gold. The club's kit includes a green vest with a single horizontal gold band.  Inside the gold band on the front of the vest is the name of the club or the club’s crest.

London Athletic Club’s Olympians 
Over sixty members of London Athletic Club have competed at the Olympic Games.  Australian Teddy Flack won the first Olympic medals for the club: double gold in the 800 and 1500 metres at the first modern Olympics in Athens. The London Olympics of 1908 saw 28 club members representing the UK and Wyndham Halswelle winning gold in the 400 metres by a controversial walkover. Several club members competed at the 1912 Olympics in Stockholm including Sidney Abrahams  (Long Jump) and Philip Noel-Baker (800 and 1500 metres), who also captained the British Olympic team at Antwerp in 1920 after World War I.  Also running for Britain at the Antwerp Olympics were R A Lindsay and Guy Butler in the winning 4 x 400 metre relay team. Guy Butler went on to win Olympic medals again in the 1924 Paris Olympics and the Amsterdam Olympics of 1928. Other club members had Olympic success in 1924 and 1928. In the 100 metres in 1924 Harold Abrahams won gold and Arthur Porritt won bronze while in the 800 metres Douglas Lowe won gold. In 1928 Lord Burghley won gold in the 400 metre hurdles and Douglas Lowe took the gold medal in the 800 metres. Douglas Neame (110 metre hurdles) and Vernon Morgan (3000 metre steeplechase) also competed at the 1928 Olympics. Club members Jack Powell (800 metres) and Roly Harper (110 metre hurdles) competed at the 1932 Olympics in Los Angeles.  Pre–World War II Olympic success continued with Frederick Wolff leading Britain’s 4 x 400 metres relay team to gold in Berlin in 1936, Brian McCabe reaching the 800 metres final and John Powell reaching the semi-final .  After WWII, at the  1948 London Olympics, Michael Pope competed in the 400 metre hurdles. Four years later, John Disley won bronze in the 3000 metre steeplechase in Helsinki in 1952 and later became synonymous with the London Marathon. Javelin thrower Richard (Dick) Miller from Northern Ireland and hurdler Jack Parker also represented Great Britain at the 1952 summer olympics. Jack Parker along with fellow hurdler Harry Kane competed in the 1956 Summer Olympics in Melbourne in the 110 metre and 400 meter hurdles respectively. The high-jumper Geoff Parsons, who competed in the 1984 and 1988 Olympic Games, reached the final in 1988.

Club Records

  * Times adjusted from 440 yard, 880 yard, 4×110 yard and 4×440 yard respectively.

History

The London Athletic Club is the oldest independent track and field club in the world: it was founded in 1863. Initially the club was named Mincing Lane Athletic Club because its members were mainly businessmen in the City of London.

Early Meetings 
Its first meeting, on 27 June 1863, was at the (then recently-opened) West London Cricket and Running Grounds, Brompton.  A later meeting, held on 9 April 1864 at Bow running grounds, was reported in The Sporting Life: “From the attendance….and the excellent sports exhibited, the club promises to become very popular”.  Meetings were held at various locations across London: another was at the West London running grounds held on 25 November 1865.  On 16 January 1866  The Sporting Life reported that the Mincing Lane Athletic Club had been renamed the London Athletic Club, because “gentlemen from all parts of London and most of the principal pedestrians of the day [were] among its members”.   Three years later, in 1869, the club moved its base to the newly-opened  Lillie Bridge Grounds, a few hundred yards north of where Stamford Bridge Stadium is today.  Then, in 1870, the brothers James and William Waddell, who had joined LAC as athletes, became treasurer and secretary. Profits soared and in 1877 they secured six and a half acres at Stamford Bridge. The grounds made LAC the premier club of the time. (The brothers fled the country in 1883 and they left the club in debt.)

The early meetings featured events such as cricket ball throwing, bicycle races and, in winter, regular “Assault at Arms” evenings which included fencing and boxing. The LAC even raised a rugby team.  Charles Dickens, Jr wrote that in 1878 LAC had 700 active and non-active (i.e. non-competing) members; it held 90 competitions with over 1,000 competitors and in that year 268 new members had joined.  In 1879 LAC held its own ‘national championships’, since its members had boycotted those of the Amateur Athletic Club based at Lillie Bridge and the forerunner to the governing body of the sport, the Amateur Athletic Association.

Early association football

The club had a football section which was an early adopted of the association football laws.  For the most part, the club only hosted matches between its members, but had a handful of games against external opposition between 1867 and 1870.  The most notable result for the club was a 3-2 win over the Wanderers in 1868, but this was largely due to a number of L.A.C. players not turning up and some of the Wanderers playing for the opposition to make the sides equal; the posts also did not have the regulation tape and the L.A.C. was credited with one goal that would ordinarily have been considered "over".  The club's most notable footballers were F.H. Hartung, who also played for the Clapham Common Club and later joined the Wanderers, and the Chinnery brothers, who also played for the Amateur Athletic Club and the C.C.C.

Stamford Bridge Years 
In 1904 London Athletic Club moved to a new stadium and grounds at Stamford Bridge.  The old stand it had used there was demolished and the new construction used spoil from excavating the tube lines of the London underground in order to level the land. The result was a grandstand overlooking a football field that was surrounded by a quarter-mile running track, a banked cycling track and terraces that held six thousand spectators. The inaugural meeting of the London Athletic Club at the new ground was held on 10 May 1905 (Chelsea Football Club used the ground in the winter months and its first match there was on 4 September 1905). The Bridge was to remain LAC’s base until 1933.

After Stamford Bridge 
During 1933 the track at Stamford Bridge was converted for use as a greyhound racing track and the club moved its base to White City after being evicted by the Greyhound Racing Association. In 1954 the club moved again to Hurlingham Park stadium, which had been opened by Roger Bannister four months after he had broken the four-minute mile barrier.  The club moved  its base yet again in 1966 to Crystal Palace, then returned to Hurlingham in 1972 and later used Motspur Park, one of the locations in the film, “Chariots of Fire”. LAC President Sir Arthur Gold appeared in the film’s depiction of the memorial service for Harold Abrahams. Today the club uses Barn Elms athletic track in west London as its base.

The First International Athletics meetings and London Athletic Club 
London Athletic Club was the leading track and field club in the 1870s, illustrated by the fact that its members held every track world record between 220 yards to 10 miles during that decade.

Walter Rye, the champion walker of the time, recalled in his autobiography what was arguably the first ever international athletics meeting, when a team from London Athletic Club weathered the Irish Sea to take part in a match in Ireland on 5 June 1876. In 1895 the club sailed to America for a match against New York Athletic club. Another international match took place in 1903 – and was celebrated with a return match in 1985 – at Le Touquet, France. As well as track and field, the events included fencing, tennis, cycling and horse-riding.

London Athletic Club’s Schools’ Meetings 
The club initiated the idea of a national athletics meeting for English schools.  The annual meetings began in the 19th century and until 1948 were restricted to public schools. The first complete London Athletic Club Public Schools’ Meeting was held at Queen's Club, on 10 April 1897. Boys competed at 100, 440, 880 yards, the mile, 120 yards hurdles, high jump and long jump.  Later meetings were held at Stamford Bridge until 1933, then mainly at White City until 1962, and then at Motspur Park. Typically over 200 schools would compete each year in the 1940s and 1950s. The schools’ meetings would lead to further club competitions against public schools and grammar schools and several of the young athletes who competed would go on to join the club.   The LAC Schools’ meetings were transferred to the Independent Schools’ Physical Education Conference in 1973.

100th and 150th Anniversaries 
The 100th and 150th anniversaries were commemorated at historically significant locations for the club.  The 100th anniversary dinner in 1963 was at the Clothworkers Hall, in Mincing Lane in the City of London–significant because the club was founded as Mincing Lane Athletic Club. HRH Prince Philip was guest of honour as President of the British Amateur Athletic Board and the President of the club, the Marquess of Exeter, was in the chair. The 150th anniversary celebration in 2013 was at Stamford Bridge stadium. The President, Richard Solomons, was in the chair and speakers included Lord Puttnam, producer of the Oscar-winning film “Chariots of Fire”, who was the guest of honour, the sports historian Philip Barker, and  Vice-President, Dr John Disley.

References

External links
 Official website
 Facebook
 Twitter

Track and field in the United Kingdom
Sports clubs in London
Sports clubs established in 1863